Thermodesulfobacterium hydrogeniphilum is a species of Sulfate-reducing bacteria. It is thermophilic, chemolithoautotrophic, non-spore-forming, marine species, with type strain SL6T (=DSM 14290T =JCM 11239T).

References

Further reading

External links 
LPSN

WORMS entry
Type strain of Thermodesulfobacterium hydrogeniphilum at BacDive -  the Bacterial Diversity Metadatabase

Bergey's volume 1
Thermodesulfobacteriota
Bacteria described in 2002